Alison Hammond (born 5 February 1975) is an English television personality and actress. She competed in the third series of the reality show Big Brother in 2002, in which she was the second housemate to be evicted. She has since become a presenter and reporter on ITV's This Morning (2002–present) and a co-presenter on the Channel 4 reality baking competition The Great British Bake Off (2023–present). 

Hammond has also appeared on reality shows such as I'm a Celebrity...Get Me Out of Here! (2010), Celebrity Coach Trip (2012), Strictly Come Dancing (2014), Celebrity Masterchef (2014), and I Can See Your Voice (2020).

As an actress, Hammond has appeared in Palace Hill (1988–1990), Doctors (2002) and The Dumping Ground (2016).

Early life 
Hammond was born on 5 February 1975, and was raised in the north Birmingham district of Kingstanding, alongside her two siblings. She attended Cardinal Wiseman School. Her mother was an immigrant from Jamaica, and had several jobs concurrently, including one as a manager for Tupperware. From the age of 11, Hammond participated in drama workshops run by Central Television, but lack of funds meant she was unable to attend drama school. She later moved to Hall Green in south Birmingham.

Career
Following her appearance on Big Brother, Hammond has appeared on many television programmes, including Celebrity Fit Club,  Celebrities Under Pressure and Big Star's Little Star.  She has also appeared on Celebrity Stars in Their Eyes, performing as Nina Simone, Celebrity Ready Steady Cook, Daily Cooks Challenge, as a panellist on ITV's Loose Women, and as a presenter on the short-lived ITV Play channel. In 2004, Hammond played herself as a TV reporter in Christmas Lights opposite Robson Green. In 2008, Hammond was named as the face of online bingo site Crown Bingo and took part in live chats, voiced characters and can be heard as the bingo caller in the bingo room. In November 2010, Hammond became a contestant on the tenth series of I'm a Celebrity...Get Me Out of Here! and, on 28 November 2010, became the fourth contestant to leave the show.

In 2014, Hammond participated in the ninth series of Celebrity MasterChef on BBC One. She also participated in the twelfth series of Strictly Come Dancing in 2014 on BBC One. She partnered with 11th series' champion Aljaž Škorjanec. They were voted off in the seventh week of competition and finished 10th. On 19 November 2015 it was announced she would compete in the annual Strictly Christmas Special. Hammond made her Hollywood debut in the animated film Hotel Transylvania 3: Summer Vacation (2018). In 2020, ITV announced a shake-up of This Morning presenters, with Hammond replacing Eamonn Holmes and Ruth Langsford on a Friday, presenting alongside Dermot O'Leary.

In December 2020, Alison appeared as a celebrity guest on game show The Wheel on BBC One.

Hammond hosted the 76th British Academy Film Awards with Richard E. Grant.

It was announced in March 2023 that Hammond would be the new co-host of The Great British Bake Off, replacing Matt Lucas.

Advertising
Hammond played The Countess in the Sainsbury's 2022 Christmas advert, starring alongside the voice of Stephen Fry. The advert was mainly used for advertising the brand's luxury range of products under the name 'Taste the Difference'. In the advert, Hammond chooses food for a festive feast, hosted by The Countess, while showcasing the brand's Christmas range.

Personal life
Hammond resides in Birmingham. She has one son, born in 2005.

Filmography

Guest appearances 

Celebrities Under Pressure (July 2004)
Hell's Kitchen (April 2009)
Hole in the Wall (October 2009)
Angela and Friends (January 2010) – 3 episodes
All Star Family Fortunes (December 2010) – Contestant, This Morning vs Emmerdale
Celebrity Who Wants to Be a Millionaire? (December 2012) – Contestant
Big Star's Little Star (9 April 2014) – Contestant
Weekend (3 May 2014) – Herself
Who's Doing the Dishes? (2014) – Celebrity chef
Celebrity Squares (19 April 2015) – Guest
The Chase: Celebrity Special (1 May 2016) – Contestant
Hacker Time (August 2016) – Guest
Tipping Point: Lucky Stars (22 October 2017) – Contestant
Catchphrase (British game show) (9 December 2018) – Contestant
Harry Hill's Alien Fun Capsule (8 June 2019) – Guest
Hollyoaks (14 June 2019) – Guest
Joe Lycett's Got Your Back (29 May 2020) – Guest
Big Brother: Best Shows Ever (22 June 2020) – Guest
DNA Journey (6 October 2022) – Guest
Saving Grace podcast (26 October 2022) – Guest

See also
 List of Big Brother (British TV series) housemates
 List of I'm a Celebrity...Get Me Out of Here! (British TV series) contestants
 List of Strictly Come Dancing contestants

References

External links
 
 

1975 births
Actresses from Birmingham, West Midlands
Big Brother (British TV series) contestants
Black British television personalities
English child actresses
English television actresses
English television presenters
Living people
I'm a Celebrity...Get Me Out of Here! (British TV series) participants
English people of Jamaican descent